You Got Served: Music from the Motion Picture is the soundtrack to the 2004 film, You Got Served. It was released on December 23, 2003 through Epic Records and mostly consisted of songs performed by B2K, but various other artists also appeared on the soundtrack. The soundtrack was a decent success, making it to 34 on the Billboard 200, 7 on the Top R&B/Hip-Hop Albums and 2 on the Top Soundtracks. One single made it to the Billboard charts, "Badaboom" performed by B2K and Fabolous made it to 59 on the Billboard Hot 100. This is the last album B2K made together before their break up in 2004 and before coming back in 2018.

Track listing
"Badaboom" - 3:41 (B2K featuring Fabolous) Vocals: Omarion, Raz-B, J-Boog
"Do That Thing" - 3:36 (B2K featuring Lil' Kim)
"Take It to the Floor" - 3:42 (B2K)
"Sprung" - 3:41 (B2K) Lead Vocals: Omarion (Background Vocals:J Booj & Raz-B)
"Out the Hood" - 4:45 (B2K) Vocals: Omarion and J-Boog
"Streets Is Callin'" - 4:13 (B2K)
"Fizzo Got Flow" - 3:24  (B2K)
"Happy" - 3:44  (Jhené featuring B2K)  
"Smile" - 3:00 (Marques Houston) 
"Smellz Like a Party" - 4:12 (O'Ryan featuring Rufus Blaq)  
"The One" - 3:49 (ATL) 
"Can I Get It Back" - 3:08 (XSO Drive featuring Red Cafe)  
"Ante Up" (Robbin Hoodz Theory) - 3:52 (M.O.P. featuring Funkmaster Flex) (produced by DR Period)

Charts

Weekly charts

Year-end charts

References

Comedy-drama film soundtracks
Hip hop soundtracks
2003 soundtrack albums
Epic Records soundtracks
Contemporary R&B soundtracks
Tyler Bates soundtracks